Clinidium whiteheadi is a species of ground beetle in the subfamily Rhysodinae. It was described by R.T. & J.R. Bell in 1985. It is named for Donald R. Whitehead. It is known from Cerro Campana in Panama. The types were collected from the fruiting bodies of the slime mold Stemonitis:

Clinidium whiteheadi measure  in length.

References

Clinidium
Beetles of Central America
Endemic fauna of Panama
Beetles described in 1985